The following is a chronicle of events during the year 1980 in ice hockey.

National Hockey League
Art Ross Trophy as the NHL's leading scorer during the regular season: Marcel Dionne, Los Angeles Kings
Hart Memorial Trophy: for the NHL's Most Valuable Player: Wayne Gretzky, Edmonton Oilers
Stanley Cup - New York Islanders defeat the Philadelphia Flyers 4 games to 2.

Canadian Hockey League
Ontario Hockey League: Peterborough Petes won J. Ross Robertson Cup.
Quebec Major Junior Hockey League: Cornwall Royals won President's Cup (QMJHL)
Western Hockey League: Regina Pats won President's Cup (WHL)
Memorial Cup: Cornwall Royals defeated Peterborough Petes

World Hockey Championship
 Men's champion: Olympic year, no tournament
 Junior Men's champion: Soviet Union defeated Finland

Winter Olympics
February - 1980 Winter Olympics: The United States men's hockey team wins the gold medal, defeating Finland in their last medal round game. Their extraordinary upset victory over the heavily favoured Soviet Union team in their previous medal round game became known as the "Miracle on Ice" in the US press.

Minor League hockey
American Hockey League: Hershey Bears Calder Cup 
IHL: The Kalamazoo Wings capture the Turner Cup.

Season articles

References